Kataria or Katariya is a
Jaat clan and surname commonly found among the Muslims, Sikhs and Hindus of the Punjab region in India and Pakistan. It is also found in other Jaat-dominated states of India.

The Kataria Jaat clan is said to derive its name from the word Katar कटार 'dagger'. They originate from Kidarites.

People with the name 
 Gulab Chand Kataria, Indian politician from Rajasthan, belonging to the Bharatiya Janata Party
 Lal Chand Kataria (born 1968), Indian politician from Rajasthan, belonging to the Indian National Congress
 Raghuvinder Kataria (born 1949), British businessman
 Rattan Lal Kataria (born 1951), Indian politician from Haryana, belonging to the Bharatiya Janata Party
 Virendra Kataria (born 1933), Indian politician from Punjab, belonging to the Indian National Congress; former Lieutenant Governor of Puducherry

References

See also 
 Katariya

Jat clans